Izgrev is a village (село) in northeastern Bulgaria, located in the Suvorovo Municipality of the Varna Province.

Population
As of December 2017, the village of Izgrev has 274 inhabitants. Its population is increasing after declining for decades. The village is exclusively inhabited by ethnic Bulgarians (100%), who are Bulgarian Orthodox by faith.

Honours
Izgrev Passage in Antarctica is named after the village.

References

Villages in Varna Province